The Sam Pollock Trophy is presented annually to the American Hockey League team that has the best regular season record in the Central Division.

The award is named after former general manager of the Montreal Canadiens Sam Pollock.

Winners

Winner by season

External links
Official AHL website
AHL Hall of Fame Trophies

American Hockey League trophies and awards